The Bandini 1300 was a racing car built in 1980 by Bandini Cars in Forlì, Italy.

It was presented in 1980 as new sports prototype in red and blue livery, divided by a thin gold colour line. Later Bandini decided to replace the blue with white as it appears today.

It was the last car with which he opened Ilario Bandini, organiser, the edition 1981 of the race uphill "Predappio-Rocca delle Camminate" that had already won several times.

The innovative features compared to previous production are mainly in search propeller 1300 cc.

The engine

The engine displacement was equal to 1300 cc, patterned after the previous experience on a Fiat monoblock. It was constructed fully from aluminium by Bandini and features a dry sump lubrication, chain distribution, double overhead camshafts, and 16 valves. The fuel injection is mechanical, and all is hooked up to a five-speed manual gearbox.

 Positioning: longitudinal rear, 4-cylinder in-line
 Materials and particularity: base monoblock to 5 media bench and league sump in aluminium, Head alloy DOHC distribution chain, four valves per cylinder vertical
 Bore: 
 Stroke: 
 Displacement: 1,289 cc
 Power: fuel injection mechanical valve guillotine
 Lubricate: Dry sump lubrication
 Cooling: forced liquid with centrifugal pump controlled by pulley and belt, cooler on the front
 Gearbox and clutch: 5 speed + RG clutch  dry discs
 Ignition and electrical equipment: coil and distributor on the head with electronic, battery 12 V and alternator

The chassis

The frame is an evolution of 1000 sports prototype that has gone before.

 Structure and material: frame of mixed section tubes round and rectangular tubes, special steel
 Suspension:
 Front: Independent, triangles overlapping with shock hydraulic telescopic tilted and springs cylindrical helical coaxial; bar stabilizing, camber recordable
 Rear: Independent, triangle and lower arms swinging shock hydraulic telescopic inclined agents on the triangle lower bar stabilizing, camber, caster and convergence recordable
 Braking system:
 Service: hydraulics, disc front and rear
 Steering: a rack and pinion
 Guide: left
 Wheels: Alloy  Bandini
 Fuel tank: 2 x 
 Transmission: differential and return rear halfshaft reached with omocinetici

The body

The bodywork is made of composite material and epoxy resin matrix fibre glass, except for the two side panels in aluminium fixed to the frame through rivets. This allows a further reduction of weight that can be used as ballast.
Compared to younger sister, the air-intake on the front and venting, are less pronounced, however the rear wing, monoplane to impact adjustable, is larger and the fairing also closes the rear of the engine compartment to the air incanalando radiator of the oil. Small openings elliptical on the front provide for the cooling of the disc brakes front and rear tyres and brakes receive grids prepared the same purpose.

See also
 Ilario Bandini
 Bandini Cars

References

Bandini vehicles
Sports prototypes
Sports cars
Cars introduced in 1980